John Michael Lucas  (13 June 1921 – 20 January 1992) was an  Anglican priest:  the Archdeacon of Totnes from 1976  to 1981.

He was  educated at Kelly College and  ordained in 1945. He held curacies at Wolborough and Ashburton before becoming Rector  of Weare Giffard in 1952. He later held incumbencies at Landcross, Monkleigh,  Northam and Chudleigh Knighton before his Archdeacon’s appointment.

Notes

1921 births
People educated at Kelly College
Archdeacons of Totnes
1992 deaths